On 24 November 2014, it was reported that a bus accident had killed 47 passengers at Jajarkot District, Nepal. In the accident, the bus crashed into the Bheri River. The accident occurred on Thursday, November 18, but it took days for the wreckage to be recovered from the river.

References

Bus incidents in Nepal
2014 in Nepal
2014 road incidents
November 2014 events in Asia
2014 bus accident